Gustave Theodore Broberg, Jr. (June 16, 1920 – November 23, 2001) was a college basketball standout, World War II pilot, lawyer and judge.

An American, Broberg played basketball as a  forward at Dartmouth College from 1938 to 1941, where he became the first Ivy League player to lead the conference in scoring for three straight seasons; he scored 13.8 points per game (ppg) as a sophomore, 14.5 ppg as a junior and 14.9 ppg as a senior. Broberg was a Helms Foundation First Team All-American as a sophomore in 1938–39, and then a two-time Consensus First Team All-American in 1940 and 1941.

Broberg played minor league baseball for a brief stint after he graduated from college, but then enlisted in the United States Marine Corps to serve as a pilot in World War II. He lost his right arm when his plane crashed, earning him a Purple Heart.

He then became a lawyer and later on a judge in Florida after earning his J.D. from the University of Virginia School of Law in 1948.

Broberg's son, Pete Broberg, would pitch in Major League Baseball and both would be inducted into the Palm Beach Sports Hall of Fame in 1984.

References

1920 births
2001 deaths
All-American college men's basketball players
Dartmouth Big Green baseball players
Dartmouth Big Green men's basketball players
Florida lawyers
Forwards (basketball)
People from Torrington, Connecticut
Sportspeople from Palm Beach, Florida
United States Marine Corps reservists
United States Marine Corps pilots of World War II
University of Virginia School of Law alumni
American men's basketball players
20th-century American lawyers
American amputees
American disabled sportspeople
Sportspeople with limb difference